Rolf Olsen may refer to:

 Rolf Olsen (actor) (1919–1998), German actor, screenwriter and film director
 Rolf Olsen (canoeist) (born 1938), Norwegian sprint canoeist
 Rolf Olsen (politician) (1818–1864), Norwegian politician and playwright

See also
 Rolf Olsson (1949–2007), politician